USS Chipola (AO-63) was a Cimarron-class fleet oiler acquired by the U.S. Navy during World War II. She served her country primarily in the Pacific Theater of Operations, and provided petroleum products where needed to combat ships. For performing this dangerous task in combat areas, she was awarded three battle stars during World War II and thirteen campaign stars during the Vietnam War.

Chipola was launched 21 October 1944 by Bethlehem Shipbuilding Corporation, Sparrows Point, Maryland; Maritime Commission hull 729, sponsored by Mrs. P. C. Chubb; and commissioned 30 November 1944.

World War II Pacific Theatre operations 
Chipola arrived at Eniwetok from the U.S. East Coast and the Netherlands West Indies 31 January 1945. She fueled ships in the harbor, and sailed 9 February to operate at sea, serving the ships of the fast carrier task forces raiding Tokyo in preparation for the invasion of Iwo Jima, and then the assault ships which carried out the landings on 19 February. Four days later, Chipola arrived at Ulithi, out of which she sailed between 23 March and 26 August, supporting the carrier task forces in the raids which preceded the Okinawa assault, and in their continuing operations during the conquest of the island. From July, she provided the oil which enabled the carriers and their screening ships to carry out a constant series of air attacks and bombardments on the Japanese home islands.

End-of-war activity 
The oiler sailed from Ulithi 8 September 1945 to serve as station tanker at Tokyo Bay and other Far Eastern ports. Between 20 February and 18 March 1946, she sailed to Bahrain in the Persian Gulf to load oil, returning to station tanker duty at Sasebo. After spending the summer on the U.S. West Coast for repairs, she returned to duty in the western Pacific from September 1946 to May 1947, making three voyages to Bahrain during that time.
 
Returning to the west coast for repairs, Chipola put to sea again 13 June 1947, and sailed west to Bahrain and the Suez Canal, making passage to Norfolk where she arrived 21 August. Almost constantly at sea on the important never-ending duty of keeping the fleet supplied with petroleum products, she voyaged from Norfolk to Bahrain, then sailed to make two voyages between Aruba and the Panama Canal Zone. She sailed from Cristóbal, for Bahrain, continuing through the Far East to San Diego, California, where she was overhauled.

Mediterranean duty 
In the second half of 1948, Chipola served ships operating in the Far East once more, making two voyages from Japan to the Persian Gulf oil ports. She returned to west coast operations until 2 September 1949, when she sailed for the Panama Canal and brief duty in the Mediterranean. Chipola sailed from Naples, Italy, for Norfolk, Virginia, and between November and July 1950, made three voyages transporting oil from the east to the west coast.
 
The oiler operated on the east coast and in the Caribbean until October 1950, when she sailed by way of Bahrain for Sasebo. She proceeded from Sasebo to Bahrain in December, and on the last day of the year sailed for San Francisco, California, and west coast duty until May 1951. Then she returned to the east coast, and carried oil from the Caribbean to Norfolk, as well as twice serving in the Mediterranean, until 3 May 1955 when she was placed in commission in reserve at Philadelphia, Pennsylvania. She was decommissioned 1 August 1955.

Service with the MSTS 
Chipola was recommissioned 29 December 1956 for service with the Military Sea Transportation Service until once more placed out of commission in reserve 7 November 1957. She was recommissioned 17 December 1960 and served with the Pacific Fleet.
 
Chipola received three battle stars for World War II service and thirteen for campaign stars during the Vietnam War.

Awards
Battle stars awarded during World War II:
 (Not recorded)

Campaign stars awarded during the Vietnam War:
 Vietnam Defense
 Vietnamese Counteroffensive
 Vietnamese Counteroffensive - Phase II
 Vietnamese Counteroffensive - Phase III
 Tet Counteroffensive
 Vietnamese Counteroffensive - Phase IV
 Vietnamese Counteroffensive - Phase VI
 Tet/69 Counteroffensive
 Vietnam Winter-Spring 1970
 Sanctuary Counteroffensive
 Vietnamese Counteroffensive - Phase VII
 Consolidation I
 Vietnam Ceasefire

References

External links 
  Dictionary of American Naval Fighting Ships USS Chipola
 NavSource Online: Service Ship Photo Archive — AO-63 Chipola
 Naval Vessel Register

 

Cimarron-class oilers (1939)
Ships built in Sparrows Point, Maryland
1944 ships
World War II auxiliary ships of the United States
World War II tankers of the United States
Cold War auxiliary ships of the United States
Vietnam War auxiliary ships of the United States